El Primer beso is a 1957 Argentine film directed by Enrique Carreras, written by Julio Porter, and starring Adrianita, Carlos Borsani and Francisco Álvarez.

Plot 
El Primer Beso is a romance between the son of a taxi driver and a salesgirl at a newsstand.

Cast

 Adrianita
 Alberto Barrie
 Carlos Borsani
 Mercedes Carreras
 Olga Gatti
 Roberto Guthie
 Perla Laske
 Eber Lobato
 María Luisa Santés
 Francisco Álvarez

Reception 
Clarín wrote that it was "[t]he best work of its director. Elemental resources, well used".

El Mundo called it a "[r]emarkable advancement".

A review in La Prensa was more critical: "It can only be conceived as made by mediocre beginners" and noted that the story background was monotonous.

References

External links 
 

1957 films
1950s Spanish-language films
Argentine black-and-white films
Films directed by Enrique Carreras
1950s Argentine films